9423 Abt, provisional designation , is a stony background asteroid from the central region of the asteroid belt, approximately 13 kilometers in diameter. It was discovered on 12 January 1996, by the Spacewatch project of the University of Arizona at Kitt Peak National Observatory, United States. The asteroid was named after American astronomer Helmut Abt.

Orbit and classification 

Abt is a non-family asteroid from the main belt's background population. It orbits the Sun in the central main-belt at a distance of 2.4–3.0 AU once every 4 years and 5 months (1,614 days). Its orbit has an eccentricity of 0.10 and an inclination of 9° with respect to the ecliptic.

Naming 

This minor planet was named after American astrophysicist Helmut Abt (born 1925), one of the founders of the discovering Kitt Peak National Observatory, after which the minor planet 2322 Kitt Peak is named. His research included stellar properties and systems. As senior editor of The Astrophysical Journal he was responsible for converting it into its digital format. The official naming citation was published by the Minor Planet Center on 11 November 2000 .

Physical characteristics

Rotation period 

In 2006, a rotational lightcurve of Abt was obtained from photometric observation at Hunters Hill Observatory, Australia. Lightcurve analysis gave a well-defined rotation period of  hours with a brightness variation of 0.30 magnitude.

In 2012, a second lightcurve from the Palomar Transient Factory, California, gave a concurring period of  hours with an amplitude of 0.33 magnitude.

Diameter and albedo 

According to the surveys carried out by the NEOWISE mission of the NASA's Wide-field Infrared Survey Explorer and the Japanese Akari satellite, Abt measures 12.690 and 12.84 kilometers in diameter, and its surface has an albedo of 0.132 and 0.141, respectively.

The Collaborative Asteroid Lightcurve Link calculates a diameter of 13.29 kilometers, assuming an albedo of 0.10, a compromise figure between the brighter stony and darker carbonaceous bodies from the inner and outer asteroid-belt, respectively.

References

External links 
 Helmut Abt, photographic archive, University of Chicago
 Helmut Abt , National Optical Astronomy Observatory
 Asteroid Lightcurve Database (LCDB), query form (info )
 Dictionary of Minor Planet Names, Google books
 Asteroids and comets rotation curves, CdR – Observatoire de Genève, Raoul Behrend
 Discovery Circumstances: Numbered Minor Planets (5001)-(10000) – Minor Planet Center
 
 

009423
009423
Named minor planets
19960112